The tabasco pepper is a variety of the chili pepper species Capsicum frutescens originating in Mexico. It is best known through its use in Tabasco sauce, followed by peppered vinegar.

Like all C. frutescens cultivars, the tabasco plant has a typical bushy growth, which commercial cultivation makes stronger by trimming the plants. The tapered fruits, around 4 cm long, are initially pale yellowish-green and turn yellow and orange before ripening to bright red. Tabascos rate from 30,000 to 50,000 on the Scoville scale of heat levels, and are the only variety of chili pepper whose fruits are "juicy", i.e., not dry on the inside . Tabasco fruits, like all other members of the C. frutescens species, remain upright when mature, rather than hanging down from their stems.

A large part of the tabasco pepper stock fell victim to the tobacco mosaic virus in the 1960s; the first resistant variety (Greenleaf tabasco) was not cultivated until around 1970.

Naming
The peppers are named after the Mexican state of Tabasco. The initial letter of tabasco is rendered in lowercase when referring to the botanical variety but capitalized when referring to the Mexican state or to the brand of hot sauce, Tabasco sauce.

Cultivation
Tabasco peppers start out green and ripen to orange and then red. It takes approximately 80 days after germination for them to fully mature. If grown outside of their natural habitat, the peppers are planted two to three weeks after the last frost when soil temperatures exceed  and the weather has settled. Peppers are temperamental when it comes to setting fruit; if temperatures are too hot or too cool, or if nighttime temperatures fall below , it can reduce fruit set. A location that receives plenty of light and heat, with soil that is fertile, lightweight, slightly acidic (pH 5.5–7.0), and well-drained, is ideal for growing the plants. Peppers need a steady supply of water for best performance. Growers are careful to make sure that fertilizers and soil are rich in phosphorus, potassium, and calcium and low in nitrogen, which can deter fruit growth.

See also
Malagueta pepper
Piri Piri
Siling labuyo
List of Capsicum cultivars

References

The information in this article is based on a translation of its German equivalent.

Chili peppers
Louisiana cuisine
Capsicum cultivars